Ke Apon Ke Por is an Indian Bengali television soap opera which aired on Bengali Entertainment Channel Star Jalsha and is available on the digital platform Disney+ Hotstar. It premiered on 25 July 2016. After airing for 4 years, the show went off air on 27 December 2020. The show was produced by Boyhood Productions of Surinder Singh, Gurjit Singh and Sushanta Das.

Ke Apon Ke Por was a family drama series starring Pallavi Sharma and Biswajit Ghosh in lead roles. Monalisa Paul played the main antagonist (Tandra), while Ananya Biswas, Arindya Banerjee, Reshmi Sen, Kalyani Mondal, Indranil Chattejee and Simran Upadhyay appear in prominent supporting roles. The show is one of the longest-running and popular serials on Bengali television.

Summary
Joba is a young girl who served as the maid in Sengupta family. Param Sengupta, the youngest son of Senguptas', returns to Kolkata and has to marry Joba to save her life. Param encourages Joba to complete her studies as well as earn a law degree, fulfilling her dream of becoming self-dependent by pursuing her career as a private-practicing lawyer. Senguptas' eldest daughter-in-law, Tandra, who sees Joba as mere a servant, tortures her in multiple times.

Eventually, Param and Joba develop feelings for each other. Param's sister, Tia married to her love interest, Topu while Param's uncle, Debranjan marries Gouri, a wicked woman. She joins with Tandra, Palak and Tandra's mother and plots against Joba.

Later, Joba exposes the true intentions of Tandra who thrown out of the house. Tandra vows to destroy Senguptas. Later, The Senguptas go on a trip to Darjeeling, where Tandra, along with Sanjay, plans an accident of Joba, which results Tanna to lose his speech. Joba is jailed for the same. Tandra fakes her pregnancy, just to compete with Joba, who is also pregnant. Tandra adopts the new-born daughter of a slum-dweller, Minoti and introduces her as her daughter. She steals Joba's new-born son and bribes the doctors to declare him dead and supplies Param with memory-losing drugs while Joba is taken back to jail.

5 years later
Joba is released and returns to the Sengupta household, which is now under Tandra and Gouri's control. She helps Param to regain his memory. Tanna gets back his speech and proves Joba's innocence. Palak apologizes to Joba for all her taunts. Joba and Param adopt a orphan named Supari, who is actually their long-lost son. Later, Joba meets Minoti and learns that her son is alive.

Joba finds that Tandra's daughter, Anu is actually being Minoti's child and gets Tandra arrested. Tandra acts as paralyzed to escape jail punishment and secretly contacts with Sanjay and her mother. Joba and Param learn that Supari is their own son. Later, they have a daughter, Koyel and rename Supari as Sarthak. Sarthak gets paralyzed due to interior damage and needs to be treated abroad.

4 years later
Joba, Param and Sarthak fly off to America, leaving Koyel in care of the other Sengupta family members. Tandra imbibes deep hatred in little Koyel's mind against her parents, especially Joba for prioritizing Sarthak than Koyel.

12 years later
Koyel has grown into a spoilt brat, being addicted to drugs, as the results of Tandra and Sanjay's plans. Joba, Param and Sarthak return to India and are shocked by seeing Koyel's behavior. Joba tries to change Koyel's behavior and eventually wins Koyel's heart. The Senguptas are now assisted by a girl Itu, who is very close to Koyel and Joba. Tinni gets married to a society entrepreneur Soheli's son Adi. Senguptas' visit to Itu's village, "Phultuli" where Sarthak is forced to marry Itu.

Sarthak refuses to accept Itu as his wife and has feelings for Soheli's daughter Rinki, who loves Sarthak only to put Joba down. Joba reveals Tandra's fake act and gets her arrested. Rinki and Soheli try to create problems among Sarthak and Itu, but he firmly stands by Itu. However, Rinky gets married with Tanna. They occur a road accident and are sent to jail. Later, Koyel falls ill and needs to have a bone marrow transplant. To save her life, Joba and Param have another daughter, Kuhu.

7 years later 
Kuhu gets older and Koyel gets recovered. Tandra changes her face by plastic surgery and returns to Sengupta house as Mayuri's friend Rumpa. Joba becomes a justice. Sarthak is falsely accused and Joba proves his innocence. The lawyer of the complainer, Surjoshekhor Mukherjee falls in love with Koyel and their marriage is fixed. But his cousin, Bishan kidnaps Koyel and forces her to marry him. Bishan's father, Pratap Nondi comes to Sengupta house and Joba identifies him, who tried to murder her mother, Ratna 35 years ago. She files a case against Pratap. Bishan hires goon including Panchali, who is later revealed as Joba's sister. Pratap gets his punishment. Bishan tries to attack Senguptas' by creating much hatred in Koyel's mind towards Joba. Koyel starts studying law to defeat her mother by fighting cases against deprived people. To reform Koyel, Joba insists Itu to study law.

5 years later 
Sarthak and Itu have a son, Shayan. Itu and Koyel are now rival lawyers in a case. Koyel loses and tries to suicide. Then she reconciles with her mother ending the hatred. Tandra returns to the Senguptas saying that she is fighting with cancer. With Bishan, she kills the client for whom Koyel was fighting and frames her in charge of murder. Itu fights for her to get the bail of Koyel and succeeds. Tandra tries to kill Joba, who is survived. Joba disguises herself as Mr. Singh, with the help of her family and joins Bishan's gang. Bishan kidnaps Koyel. Joba and Param manage to save her. Eventually, Joba exposes Tandra's every wicked moves and gets her arrested. Finally, Joba and Param get remarried while uniting Koyel and Shurjo, leading to a happy ending.

Cast

Main

Recurring

Soundtrack
The title song of the series Ke Apon Ke Por is a duet sung by singers Trisha Parui and Shovon Ganguly. The original music has been given by Debjit Roy, while Priyo Chattopadhyay is the lyricist for this track.

Adaptations

Reception
Until being aired at the prime time slot of 7:30 pm IST, it remained one of the top rated Bengali television program. However, on 17 August 2020, it was shifted to a late night slot of 10:30 pm IST while the ratings dropped and it was off aired on 27 December 2020.

References

External links
 Official Website at Disney+ Hotstar

Bengali-language television programming in India
2016 Indian television series debuts
2020 Indian television series endings
Star Jalsha original programming